Sanjamala or Sanjemula is a village in Nandyal district of Andhra Pradesh, India. It is located in Sanjamala mandal. There is a temple called Venkateswara Swamy Temple. There is only one government school. Its old name is Chenchelimala.

References

Villages in Nandyal district